Arne Nielsen (1 October 1895 – 20 June 1942) was a Danish sports shooter. He competed in the 50 m rifle event at the 1924 Summer Olympics.

References

External links
 

1895 births
1942 deaths
Danish male sport shooters
Olympic shooters of Denmark
Shooters at the 1924 Summer Olympics
Sportspeople from Aarhus